"All in Your Name" is a song written and performed by Barry Gibb and Michael Jackson. It was recorded in 2002, and released on 25 June 2011, the second anniversary of Jackson's death in 2009.

Writing and background 
Billboard reported on 20 December 2002 that Gibb wrote a song with Jackson recently in protest of the United States government's plan to invade Iraq (which took place in March 2003). There are rumors that Jackson showed up one day with a partly written song and talked Gibb into contributing to it. The date was probably in the summer of 2002. A fan said that Gibb has a demo recording of it, but Gibb himself would not confirm that any of this happened.

Gibb explains:

"Michael Jackson and I were the dearest of friends, that's simply what it was. We gravitated towards the same kind of music and we loved collaborating and he was the easiest person to write with. The more we got to know each other the more those ideas entwined and it all came to this song 'All In Your Name'. 'All in Your Name' is in fact the message that Michael wanted to send out to all of his fans all over the world that he did it all for them and for the pure love of music. I hope and pray that we all get to hear it in its entirety. This experience I will treasure forever.

Release 
Barry Gibb sings lead vocals much of the song with short sections performed by Michael Jackson. The cover of the single featured Gibb and Jackson in the recording studio in 1985, when producing together Diana Ross' song "Eaten Alive".
Jackson's voice for emotional bursts in the same way as Robin Gibb's voice is sometimes used.

The creative process for the song was recorded and eventually edited into a music video, released on Gibb's website after the release of the song.

Personnel 
 Barry Gibb – lead vocal, guitar
 Michael Jackson – lead vocal, percussion
 Steve Rucker – drums
 Matt Bonelli – bass
 Alan Kendall – guitar
 Hal Roland and Doug Emery – keyboards
 Recorded at Middle Ear Studios, Miami Beach, Florida
 Recorded by John Merchant, assisted by Ashley Gibb
 Produced by Barry Gibb and John Merchant

References 

2002 songs
2011 singles
Barry Gibb songs
Michael Jackson songs
Male vocal duets
Songs released posthumously
Songs written by Barry Gibb
Songs written by Michael Jackson